A cup-bearer was historically an officer of high rank in royal courts, whose duty was to pour and serve the drinks at the royal table. On account of the constant fear of plots and intrigues (such as poisoning), a person must have been regarded as thoroughly trustworthy to hold the position. He would guard against poison in the king's cup, and was sometimes required to swallow some of the drink before serving it. His confidential relations with the king often gave him a position of great influence. The position of cup-bearer has been greatly valued and given only to a select few throughout history.

The cup-bearer as an honorific role, for example as the Egyptian hieroglyph for "cup-bearer," was used as late as 196 BC in the Rosetta Stone for the Kanephoros cup-bearer Areia, daughter of Diogenes; each Ptolemaic Decree starting with the Decree of Canopus honored a cup-bearer. A much older role was the appointment of Sargon of Akkad as cup-bearer in the 23rd century BC.

Cup-bearers in the Bible 

Cup-bearers are mentioned several times in the Bible.

The position is first mentioned in Genesis 40:1, although the Hebrew word (elsewhere translated as "cup-bearer") is here sometimes rendered as "butler". The phrase "chief of the butlers" accords with the fact that there were often a number of such officials under one as chief. In the Post-exilic period, Nehemiah rose to the high ranking palace position of cup-bearer to King Artaxerxes, the sixth King of the Median / Persian Empire. The position placed his life on the line every day, but gave Nehemiah authority and high pay. He was held in high esteem by Artaxerxes, as the record shows. His financial ability would indicate that the office was a lucrative one.

The title , once thought to mean "chief of the cupbearers" is now given a different derivation and explained as "chief of the officers" or "princes".

Cup-bearers in Greek myth 

In Greek mythology, Hêbê, the goddess of youth, was the original cup-bearer to the Greek gods of Mount Olympus, serving them nectar and ambrosia. Hêbê is the daughter of Zeus and Hera and is described performing her duties as cup-bearer in the Iliad:

 "The gods were seated near to Zeus in council,
 upon a golden floor. Graciously Hêbê
 served them nectar, as with cups of gold
 they toasted one another, looking down
 toward the stronghold of Ilion."
 — 

Hêbê's role of cup bearer ended when she was then replaced by Ganymede. She then married the deified hero Heracles, who joined Hêbê among the gods and goddesses and started a family.

The Roman gods are also closely related to Greek mythology, with the Roman goddess of youth Juventas being the counterpart to Greek Hêbê.

Cup-bearers in Byzantium

Cup-bearers as palatine officers in Visigothic Spain 
One of the palatine officers who was in the service of the Visigothic kings was called Comes Scanciorum, or "Count of the Cup-bearers." The count would have poured the king's wine or drink personally while the other cup-bearers served other distinguished guests at the royal table.

Cup-bearers as a Great Office in the Holy Roman Empire 
The King of Bohemia ranked as Arch-Cupbearer of the Holy Roman Empire.  His duties were normally performed only during coronations.  At other times, the Count of Limpurg and, after 1714, Count of Althann served as cupbearers for the Emperor.

Cup bearers in Anglo-Saxon England

The office of butler or cup-bearer (pincerna in Medieval Latin) in Anglo-Saxon England was occupied by aristocrats who were in charge of drinks at royal feasts. In the tenth and eleventh centuries they were appointed from among the thegns, the third rank of nobles, after the king and ealdormen.

Cup-bearer in Shakespeare 

Camillo in The Winter's Tale is cupbearer to Leontes, King of Sicily, and Polixenes, King of Bohemia. When Leontes becomes convinced of his wife Hermione's infidelity with Polixenes, he entreats Camillo to use his privileged position as his cupbearer to poison Polixenes:

Ay, and thou
his cupbearer, whom I from meaner form
have benched and reared to worship, who mayst see
plainly, as heaven sees earth sees heaven,
how I am gallèd, might bespice a cup
to give mine enemy a lasting wink
which draft to me were cordial.
 — Shakespeare, The Winter's Tale (1.2)

Cup-bearers in Ireland 
Theobald Walter was the first Chief Butler of Ireland. Although the terms "cup-bearer" and "butler" are sometimes used interchangeably, they were two distinct roles at the coronation feast.

Kingdom of Hungary 
The pohárnokmester (Master of the Cupbearers), also called the főpohárnok, was the supervisor of the cupbearers at court and across the royal court system, a chief court officer/dignitary. The first mention of him dates from 1148.

Poland and Lithuania
The cup-bearer was a court office in Poland and Lithuania until the end of the 13th century. The holder was responsible for the wine-cellar of the King and for serving him cups with wine at banquets. Since the 14th century, it has been an honorary court title in the Crown of Poland and Grand Duchy of Lithuania, and in the Polish–Lithuanian Commonwealth.

 cześnik koronny – King's Cup-Bearer of the Crown
 cześnik litewski – Grand Duke's Cup-Bearer of Lithuania 
 cześnik ziemski – District King's Cup-Bearer

According to the district office hierarchy in 1768, the position in the Crown was over Łowczy and under Podstoli; In the Grand Duchy of Lithuania over Horodniczy and under Podczaszy.

See also 
 Bartender
 Food taster
 Paharnic
 Pinkernes
 Sommelier

References

This article is adapted from an article in the 1915 International Standard Bible Encyclopedia, which is now in the public domain

External links

International Standard Bible Encyclopedia public-domain article
Walton, O.F. (2005). The King's Cup-bearer.
Manguel, Alberto. The Iliad. book IV, 1–5. Atlantic Monthly Press.
(The Holy Bible: 1 Kings 10:3-7 RSV)
(The Holy Bible: Nehemiah 1:11-2:6 RSV)
(The Holy Bible: 1 Corinthians 10:21)
"Mythography- The Greek Goddess Hêbê in Myth and Art"

 
Ceremonial occupations
Food services occupations
Obsolete occupations
Wine tasting